Konkola Stadium is a multi-purpose stadium in Chililabombwe, Zambia.  Built in the 1950s, it is currently used mostly for football matches and serves as the home for Konkola Blades Football Club and  Konkola Mine Police. The stadium holds 20,000 people.

References

Football venues in Zambia
Multi-purpose stadiums in Zambia
Buildings and structures in Copperbelt Province